[Gajarkot]  is a village development committee in Tanahu District in the Gandaki Zone of central Nepal. At the time of the 1991 Nepal census it had a population of 5385 people living in 983 individual households. It contains 9 wards.
Ward No.: 1 »» Kathekot, 
Ward No.: 2 »» Katahre, 
Ward No.: 3 »» Dumkot, 
Ward No.: 4&5 »» Putgau & Puttar, 
Ward No.: 6 »» Attrouli, 
Ward No.: 7 »» Baindi, 
Ward No.: 8 »» Gajarkot., & 
Ward No.: 9 »» Dumrebesi.

The community here consist of mixed type. Magar and Newar are in majority in Kathekot and Dumkot while Brahman and Kshetri are in majority in Baindi, Dumribesi, Atrouli and Puttar. A cannel from local  Maidi Khola is dug that irrigates the plain land of Baindi, Bhantar, Atrouli and Puttar. A small cannel (Nahar) dug by the Khanal family around 2020 BS irrigates the fields of Baindi.

References

External links
UN map of the municipalities of Tanahu District

Populated places in Tanahun District